Johnson Akuchie (born January 6, 1990) is a Nigerian association football forward currently playing for Flandria of the Primera B Metropolitana in Argentina.

External links
 

1990 births
Living people
Nigerian footballers
Nigerian expatriate footballers
Expatriate footballers in Argentina
Nigerian expatriate sportspeople in Argentina
Association football forwards
Flandria footballers